Mojca Kleva (born March 30, 1976) is a Slovene political scientist and politician born in Koper (Slovenia). On May 9 2011 she became a Member of the European Parliament replacing Zoran Thaler who resigned from the position due to accusations regarding corruption. She is a member of Social Democrats, center-left wing political party in Slovenia.

Biography 
Mojca Kleva graduated from the Faculty of Social Sciences at the University of Ljubljana in political science in 2002 and later acquired master's degree also in political science in 2006.

After her studies Kleva was following the EU accession process of Estonia and Lithuania at the European Parliament in Brussels. In 2004 she returned to Slovenia where she became an advisor in the National Assembly of the Republic of Slovenia, working on areas of European affairs, human rights and education. In 2009 she became a permanent representative of the National Assembly of the Republic of Slovenia to the European Parliament in Brussels. In May 2011 Mojca Kleva replaced Zoran Thaler as a member of the European Parliament within S&D (Group of the Progressive Alliance of Socialists and Democrats).

Between 1999 and 2009 Mojca Kleva was a member Municipal Council of Koper, she also actively participated and led network of non-governmental organizations from the field of women's rights - Women's lobby Slovenia between 2007 and 2009.

Member of the European Parliament 
 Group of the Progressive Alliance of Socialists & Democrats in the European Parliament (S&D), Member 
 Committee on Regional Development, Member 
 Committee on Economic and Monetary Affairs, Substitute 
 Committee on Women's Rights and Gender Equality, Substitute 
 Delegation to the EU-Armenia, EU-Azerbaijan and EU-Georgia Parliamentary Cooperation Committees, Vice-president
 Delegation to the Euronest Parliamentary Assembly, Member 
 Delegation to EU-Former Yugoslav Republic of Macedonia Joint Parliamentary Committee, Substitute

References

External links 
 Official page of the party
 Official page of the MEP

1976 births
Living people
University of Ljubljana alumni
Politicians from Koper
Social Democrats (Slovenia) MEPs